Richard Jon Camarillo (born November 29, 1959) is a former professional American football punter who played 16 seasons in the NFL for the New England Patriots (1981–1987), Los Angeles Rams (1988), Phoenix Cardinals (1989–1993), Houston Oilers (1994–1995), and Oakland Raiders (1996).

Camarillo attended El Rancho High School in Pico Rivera, California, graduating in 1977. Before his NFL career, he earned All-America honors at Cerritos Junior College. He then transferred to the University of Washington (1979-1980), where he was selected as a member of the Huskies All-Century team.                                                                                                                                     

A consistently solid, dependable punter during his 16 NFL seasons, Camarillo led the league in punting yards twice (1985, 1994), net yard average three times (1983, 1991, & 1992), and gross yards per punt once (1989). He also led the league in 1994 with 35 balls inside the 20.  With the Patriots, Camarillo made a championship appearance in Super Bowl XX, and ended up punting often as his team was blown out 46-10 by the Chicago Bears.  Camarillo punted 6 times for 263 yards (43.8 avg), with 225 net yards (37.5 avg), 1 touchback, and 1 punt in the 20, including a then Super Bowl record 62-yard punt that planted the Bears back at their own 4-yard line, this record being broken by another Patriots punter, Ryan Allen, who kicked a 64-yard punt in Super Bowl XLIX. However, Chicago still managed to drive a Super Bowl-record 96 yards and score a touchdown anyway.

Camarillo finished his career with 1,027 punts for 43,895 yards (42.7 avg) and 279 punts inside the 20. Upon his retirement, that mark stood as the most in NFL history. Camarillo also had a career net average of 36.0 yards per punt. He was named to the NFL's all-rookie team in 1981. He was also selected to five Pro Bowl games after the 1983, 1989, 1991, 1992, and 1993 seasons, with Ray Guy and Shane Lechler sharing the record with seven appearances each as of 2016.  Camarillo had a punt returned for a touchdown in his first NFL game on October 25, 1981. Fourteen seasons and 876 punts later on October 30, 1994, would be the next time one of his punts was returned for a score. He also owns the NFL's record for highest net avg. in a season with a mark of 39.6 yards.  Camarillo's 44.5 yards per punt still stands as the highest punting average in NFL playoff history. He was also selected seven times (first or second-team) All-Pro, in his career. He was also named to the team of the 1990s by CNNSI.  Camarillo was a nominee for induction into the NFL Pro Football Hall of Fame, class of 2009.

Camarillo coached the Ahwatukee Little League All-stars from Phoenix, Arizona in the 2006 Little League World Series in Williamsport, Pennsylvania. His son, Eric, was a member of that team.

On 14 September 2009, Camarillo was selected to the 50 Greatest New England Patriots Team.

External links
 Camarillo's stats

1959 births
Living people
American football punters
Cerritos Falcons football players
Washington Huskies football players
New England Patriots players
Los Angeles Rams players
Phoenix Cardinals players
Houston Oilers players
Oakland Raiders players
American Conference Pro Bowl players
Sportspeople from Whittier, California
Players of American football from California